Potsdam High School is a public four-year high school located in Potsdam, New York. It is operated by the Potsdam Central School District.

Extracurriculars

Athletics 
As of 2022, the school offered a variety of sports teams that include baseball, basketball, cheer, cross country, football, golf, ice hockey, lacrosse, soccer, swimming, softball, track and field, volleyball, and wrestling.

Quiz bowl 
Potsdam High School won the WPBS-TV's Whiz Quiz contests in 2019 and was awarded the Glenn Gough Championship Trophy.

Civic engagement 
The Potsdam High School Positivity Club received a $10,000 grant from the KFC Foundation's Kentucky Fried Wishes program in September 2021 to help improve its community food market and obtain laptop computers for senior citizens.

References

External links 
 

Public high schools in New York (state)
Schools in St. Lawrence County, New York